Jacob Kai Murphy (born 24 February 1995) is an English professional footballer who plays as a winger for Premier League club Newcastle United.

Murphy made his first-team debut for Norwich City in an FA Cup match against Fulham in January 2014. He has also played on loan for Swindon Town, Southend United and Sheffield Wednesday. He is the twin brother of professional footballer Josh Murphy. The brothers are nephews of former Ipswich Town utility player Tommy Parkin.

Club career

Norwich City 
Murphy was born in Wembley, London. Along with his twin brother, Josh, he first played football together from the age of seven, and eventually they both joined Norwich City as under-12s in 2006. It was announced on 31 March 2011 that the duo were to join the club's academy ahead of a new season.

Murphy was a part of the Norwich City youth team which won the 2012–13 FA Youth Cup. He signed his first professional contract for Norwich City on 4 January 2013. In December 2013, he signed a three-year contract with the club.

Murphy made his professional debut in a FA Cup match against Fulham on 4 January 2014. Murphy made his first Norwich City appearance in the 2014–15 season, where he provided an assist for his twin brother, Josh, to score in a 3–1 win over Crawley Town in the second round of the League Cup.

Loan spells 
On 7 February 2014, he joined Swindon Town on loan which began on 8 February, and lasted until 8 March 2014 Murphy made his debut for the club on 8 February 2014, when he came on as a second-half substitute for Dany N'Guessan in a 3–2 win over Port Vale. After making six appearances, Murphy returned to Norwich City after Swindon Town delayed their decision to extend his loan.

On 27 March 2014, Murphy joined League Two club Southend United on loan for the remainder of the 2013–14 season. He made his Southend debut days later, when he came on as a substitute and provided the winning goal in a 1–0 win over Torquay United. He scored his first goal for the club and provided an assist in a 3–1 win over Rochdale on 18 April 2014. He went on to make eight appearances for the club, including in the play-offs, but was unable to help the club get promoted to League One.

On 3 November 2014, he joined Blackpool on loan until 2 February 2015. He scored on his debut two days later in a 2–2 draw with Fulham. He scored again on 22 November 2014, in a 1–1 draw with Bolton Wanderers. His performances at Blackpool earned him November's Wonga Player of the Month award. The following month, Murphy caused controversy when he posted an image on social media application Snapchat with the caption "We are going to lose... Again", which mocked the club's recent league form. Murphy issued an apology via the club's official website, admitting it was an unprofessional and foolish thing to do; however, Lee Clark vowed to investigate this matter before taking action. Blackpool cut short his loan deal on 31 December.

After his loan spell at Blackpool came to an end, Murphy joined League One club Scunthorpe United on a month-long loan. Two days later on 10 January 2015, he made his Scunthorpe United debut, making his first start, where he provided an assist for Tom Hopper, who was also making his debut, in a 4–1 win over Walsall. After making three appearances for the club, Murphy's loan spell with Scunthorpe United came to an end.

Murphy next joined League One club Colchester United on loan until the end of the season. He made his Colchester United debut on 14 March 2015 on the right wing, in a 3–2 loss to Crawley Town. He then scored in the next game against Yeovil Town on 17 March 2015, which Colchester won 2–0. He scored two goals in two games in three days against Port Vale and Barnsley. The last two games of the season saw Murphy scored in a 1–1 draw against Swindon Town and then helped the club survive relegation when they beat Preston North End.

On 14 August 2015, Murphy signed for Coventry City on a season-long loan deal.
 He had a successful full season there, scoring 10 times in 42 games, with nine of the goals coming in the league.

Return to Norwich City 
Murphy scored his first goal for Norwich in a 4–1 win over Blackburn Rovers on 6 August 2016. His first full season at Norwich yielded 10 goals in 40 games, including nine in the league.

Newcastle United 
Murphy signed for Newcastle United for an undisclosed fee on 19 July 2017. He cited Newcastle United as his boyhood team and stated that it was his dream to represent the club. Murphy's parents were born in the local area and he has family members from Newcastle's neighbouring town Gateshead. Murphy scored his first goal for Newcastle in a 3–1 loss to Manchester City on 20 January 2018.

On 7 July 2021, Murphy signed a contract extension with Newcastle United.

West Bromwich Albion
On 31 January 2019, Murphy joined West Bromwich Albion on loan until August.

Sheffield Wednesday
On 8 August 2019, Murphy joined Sheffield Wednesday on loan until the end of the season. Murphy ended his loan spell with nine goals from 39 league appearances for the Owls, ending the season as the club's second top scorer behind Steven Fletcher.

International career 
Murphy was called up to the England U18s in October 2012 and made his debut in a 2–0 win over Italy U18s on 24 October 2012.

In November 2012, Murphy was called up by England U19s. His debut came in a 1–0 win over Finland U19s on 13 November 2012.

In late 2014, Murphy was called up by England U20s after his brother Josh withdrew from the squad and made his debut in a 3–2 win over Netherlands U20s on 14 October 2014.

In 2017 Murphy was called up to the England U21s squad. In his first game he scored twice in a 3–0 win over Iceland U21s. Jacob Murphy scored his third goal for Englands U21s on 22 June 2017, when he came on as a substitute to score an overhead bicycle kick and put the U21s through to the semi finals of the 2017 UEFA European Under-21 Championship.

Personal life 
The twins talked about their close bonds and being there for each other. Their parents and his younger brother live in Downham Market and run their Arbuckles restaurant, near Downham Market. Their father, John, works as an assistant principal at Downham Market Academy. While on the pitch, Chris Hughton, manager at the time, told the twins to wear different coloured boots so that he could tell them apart. Murphy is of Irish descent.

Career statistics

Honours
Newcastle United
EFL Cup runner-up: 2022–23

References

External links 

Jacob Murphy profile at the Newcastle United F.C. website
Jacob Murphy profile  at the Football Association website

1995 births
Living people
Footballers from Wembley
English footballers
Association football wingers
Norwich City F.C. players
Swindon Town F.C. players
Southend United F.C. players
Blackpool F.C. players
Scunthorpe United F.C. players
Colchester United F.C. players
Coventry City F.C. players
Newcastle United F.C. players
Sheffield Wednesday F.C. players
English Football League players
Premier League players
England youth international footballers
England under-21 international footballers
English people of Irish descent
Twin sportspeople
English twins
Black British sportsmen